Bir el-Ater district is an Algerian administrative district located in the Province of Tébessa.  Its chief town is located on the eponymous commune of Bir el-Ater.

The district includes the two communes of Ogla Melha and Bir el-Ater.

References 

Districts of Tébessa Province